Morgan Rewind: A Tribute To Lee Morgan, Vol. 2 is a double album by jazz pianist Roberto Magris released on the JMood label in 2014, featuring performances by Magris with his septet from Kansas City.

Reception

The DownBeat review by Sean J. O’Connell awarded the album 3 ½ stars and simply states: “This is a fun set of hard-driving swing that upholds the spirit of its honoree, shining a light on the trumpeter’s lesser-known compositions.”  The All About Jazz review by Dan McClenaghan awarded the album 4 ½ stars and simply states: “This is classic hard bop, blowing and swinging hard, nudged a bit in a modern direction, laid down with a zesty joi de vive.”  The All About Jazz review by Edward Blanco awarded the album 4 ½ stars and simply states: “Pianist Roberto Magris designs a hard-driving swinging tribute to a long gone legend, transforming Morgan's bop-infused style with an energetic percussive new twist.”

Track listing
CD 1
 A Bid for Sid (Lee Morgan) - 5:59 
 Exotique (Lee Morgan) - 7:53 
 Blue Lace  (Lee Morgan) - 7:14 
 Cunning Lee  (Lee Morgan) - 6:41 
 The Sixth Sense  (Lee Morgan) - 5:32 
 Soft Touch  (Lee Morgan) - 7:03 
 Gary’s Notebook  (Lee Morgan) - 7:38 
 CD 2
 Speedball  (Lee Morgan) - 5:10 
 Libreville (Roberto Magris) - 9:29 
 Get Yo’self Togetha  (Lee Morgan) - 6:51 
 A Summer’s Kiss (Roberto Magris) - 7:33 
 Zambia  (Lee Morgan) - 4:58 
 Helen’s Ritual  (Lee Morgan) - 6:46 
 Audio Notebook - 6:46

Personnel

Musicians
Hermon Mehari – trumpet
Jim Mair – tenor sax, soprano sax, flute
Peter Schlamb – vibraphone
Roberto Magris - piano
Elisa Pruett - bass
Brian Steever - drums
Pablo Sanhueza - congas and percussion

Production
 Paul Collins – executive producer and producer
 George Hunt – engineering
 Stephen Bocioaca – design
 Jerry Lockett – photography

References

Roberto Magris albums
2014 albums